The Little Cat is a 1996 Russian children's adventure film directed by Ivan Popov.

Plot 
A girl from the musician's family wanted to buy a cat. Suddenly, the cat fell out of the window and was on the roof of the car, because of which he drove away from home.

Cast 
 Andrei Kuznetsov as Fedin
 Lyudmila Arinina as Grandmother
 Aleksey Voytyuk as Father
 Tatyana Grauz as Mother
 Mariya Popova as Manya (as Masha Popova)
 Aleksandr Popov as Sanya (as Sasha Popov)
 Aleksandr Churgin as Conductor
 Aleksandr Peskov as Thug #1
 Oleg Vershinin as Thug #2

References

External links 
 

1996 films
1990s Russian-language films
Russian children's adventure films
Films about cats
1990s children's adventure films